"Strange Glue" is a song by Welsh rock group Catatonia. Written by guitarist Owen Powell, it was the band's fourth single to be released from International Velvet and charted at  11 on the UK Singles Chart. As a solo artist, lead singer Cerys Matthews later sang "Strange Glue" merged with the song "Galway Shawl" in concert.

B-side

The single's B-side, "That's All Folks", was originally intended for the International Velvet album and had appeared on promo copies around the time of "I Am the Mob", but it was later replaced by "My Selfish Gene" as the album's closer. The song is a scathing attack on Catatonia's American label, Warner, written in 1997 when the band feared that they were to be dropped by the label or were to split up.

Track listings
UK CD single
 "Strange Glue"
 "Road Rage" (live from the Shepherd's Bush Empire)
 "That's All Folks"

UK cassette and limited-edition 7-inch red vinyl single
 "Strange Glue"
 "That's All Folks"

Credits and personnel
Credits are lifted from the UK CD single inlay.

Studio
 Recorded at Monnow Valley Studios (Rockfield, Wales)

Personnel

 Owen Powell – writing
 Catatonia – writing, production
 Tommy D – production, mixing
 Roland Herrington – mixing
 Joe Gibb – engineering
 Jason Harris – assistant engineering
 Stylorouge – design and art direction
 FTP – digital imaging
 Perou – photography
 Nigel Schermuly – TV photography

Charts

References

1998 singles
1998 songs
Blanco y Negro Records singles
Catatonia (band) songs